Barcaldine was a railway station located in Barcaldine, Argyll and Bute, near the southern shore of Loch Creran. It was on the Ballachulish branch line that linked Connel Ferry, on the main line of the Callander and Oban Railway, with Ballachulish.

History
The station opened to passengers in 1914. It comprised a single platform on the east side of the line. A siding was installed at the same time, to the south of the platform. In 1933 a Howe truss was built along the northern outskirts of Oban near the station to allow train access over lake areas between Loch Creran and Bercaldine. In 1970 the Howe truss was converted to pedestrian use.

The station closed in 1966, when the Ballachulish Branch of the Callander and Oban Railway was closed.

References

Notes

Sources 
 
 
 

Railway stations in Great Britain opened in 1914
Railway stations in Great Britain closed in 1966
Disused railway stations in Argyll and Bute
Beeching closures in Scotland
Former Caledonian Railway stations
1914 establishments in Scotland